Cotes may refer to:

Placename
 Cotes, Cumbria, a village in England
 Cotes, Leicestershire, a village in England
 Cotes, Staffordshire, a village in England; see List of United Kingdom locations: Cos-Cou
 Cotes, Valencia, a municipality in Spain

Other
 Cotes (surname), list of people with the surname
 Cotes (beetle), a beetle genus in the sub family Lemodinae
 Control of International Trade in Endangered Species (COTES), a British organisation
 Newton–Cotes formulas, in mathematics

See also
 
 Coates (disambiguation)
 Coats (disambiguation)
 Côtes-d'Armor
 Cote (disambiguation)